As I Am is Kristin Chenoweth's second solo album, released in 2005. The song Borrowed Angels was written by Diane Warren and given to Chenoweth. The same song was re-recorded and released on a country version on Chenoweth's 2011 album, Some Lessons Learned.

Reception

The album received fairly positive reviews from critics, with AllMusic awarding it 3.5 stars, saying "There's a slickness suitable to Chenoweth's flawless voice. Though its slickness is suited to the material, As I Am can also seem to flutter inside its own perfect globe, untouched by the elements and radiant as Chenoweth's golden hair." The album received an extremely positive review from Christian website Crosswalk.com. Mixed reviews from The Ledger and The Buffalo News both praised the "Taylor, the Latte Boy" as a standout track.

The album peaked at No. 31 on Billboard′s Christian Albums chart.

Track listing 
 "It Will Be Me" - 3:57
 "Word of God Speak" - 3:15
 "Because He Lives" - 4:56
 "Abide in Me" - 5:09
 "Borrowed Angels" - 4:02
 "There Will Never Be Another" - 3:59
 "Poor, Wayfaring Stranger" - 5:09
 "Joyful, Joyful" - 3:29
 "The Song Remembers When" - 3:55
 "Power" - 4:20
 "Just As I Am" - 3:42
 "Upon This Rock" - 4:59
 "Taylor, the Latte Boy" - 4:05

References 

Kristin Chenoweth albums
2005 albums